Santa Lucía Milpas Altas is a town and municipality in the Guatemalan department of Sacatepéquez. The town has a population of 12,234 (2018 census).

History

In the 1540s, bishop Francisco Marroquín split the ecclesiastical administration of the central valley of Guatemala between the Order of Preachers and the Franciscans, assigning Sumpango's curato to the former.  In 1638, the Dominicans separated their large doctrines in groups revolving around six convents:

Ecclesiastic historian Domingo Juarros wrote that in 1754, by virtue of a royal order of the borbon reforms of king Carlos III all curatos and doctrines of the regular clergy were moved on to the secular clergy.

Climate

Santa Lucía Milpas Altas has a subtropical highland climate (Köppen climate classification: Cwb).

Geographic location

This municipality is 9 km from Antigua Guatemala.

See also
 
 
 List of places in Guatemala

Notes and references

References

Bibliography

 
 
 

Municipalities of the Sacatepéquez Department